Reinhard Majgl (born 4 December 1949) is a retired German football forward.

Career

Statistics

References

External links
 

1949 births
Living people
German footballers
Bundesliga players
2. Bundesliga players
VfL Bochum players
K.A.S. Eupen players
SC Fortuna Köln players
1. FC Bocholt players
Place of birth missing (living people)
Association football forwards